The 2019 Drexler-Automotive Formula 3 Cup was the 38th Austria Formula 3 Cup season and the first Drexler-Automotive Formula 3 Cup season.

Teams and drivers
All Cup cars were built between 2008 and 2012, while Trophy cars were built between 1992 and 2007.

Calendar & Race results
A provisional calendar was released in early 2019.

Championship standings

Standings for all competitions are shown below.

Drexler-Automotive Formula 3 Cup

Drexler-Automotive Formula 3 Trophy

RAVENOL Formula 3 Cup

Swiss Formula 3 Cup

References

External links
Website of the AFR Cups [German]

Austria Formula 3 Cup
Formula 3
Drexler-Automotive F3 Cup
Drexler-Automotive F3 Cup
Drexler-Automotive F3 Cup